Ger (Yiddish: גער, also Gur, adj. Gerrer) is a Polish Hasidic dynasty originating from the town of Góra Kalwaria, Poland, where it was founded by Yitzchak Meir Alter (1798–1866), known as the "Chiddushei HaRim". Ger is a branch of Peshischa Hasidism, as Yitzchak Meir Alter was a leading disciple of Simcha Bunim of Peshischa (1765–1827). Before the Holocaust, followers of Ger were estimated to number in excess of 100,000, making it the largest and most influential Hasidic group in Poland. Today, the movement is based in Jerusalem, and its membership is estimated at 11,859 families, as of 2016, most of whom live in Israel, making Ger the largest Hasidic dynasty in Israel. However, there are also well-established Ger communities in the United States and in Europe. In 2019, some 300 families of followers led by Shaul Alter, split off from the dynasty led by his cousin Yaakov Aryeh Alter.

History 

In his early years, Yitzchak Meir Alter became a close disciple of Simcha Bunim of Peshischa, who preached the ideals of Talmudic-rationalism, and the pursuance of personal authenticity, which would later go on to be foundational tenets of Ger Hasidism. After Simcha Bunim's death in 1827, Yitzchak Meir Alter was among his more radical supporters who followed Menachem Mendel of Kotzk, rather than Simcha Bunim's son, Avraham Moshe. The Kotzker Rebbe continued in the ideological tradition of Peshischa, and after his death in 1859, the vast majority of his followers, accepted Yitzchak Meir Alter as his successor, rather than his son Dovid. Yitzchak Meir Alter was living in Warsaw at the time, where he operated a Kotzker shtiebel. Shortly after accepting the role of Rebbe, Yitzchak Meir was appointed as the Av Beit Din of Góra Kalwaria (Ger in Yiddish), where he established his own Hasidic court. After his death in 1866, his followers wanted his eighteen-year-old grandson, Yehudah Aryeh Leib Alter, to succeed him. When Yehuda Aryeh Leib refused to accept this position, most of the Hasidim became followers of the elderly Hasid, Chanokh Heynekh HaKohen Levin, after whose death, Yehudah Aryeh Leib, acceded to the request of the Hasidim to become their next rebbe. The Gerrer movement flourished under the leadership of Yehudah Aryeh Leib and his eldest son and successor, Avraham Mordechai Alter, known as the "Imrei Emes". In 1926, in a bold departure for Polish Hasidim, Avraham Mordechai established a yeshiva in Jerusalem, naming it for his father, the Sfas Emes. The first rosh yeshiva was Rabbi Nechemiah Alter, a brother of the Imrei Emes. Today, the yeshiva remains the flagship of the Ger yeshivas.Under the leadership of the fifth Gerrer Rebbe, Yisrael Alter, known as the "Beis Yisrael", the Ichud Mosdos Gur or Union of Gerrer Institutions, was established as the responsible body for funding all the educational institutions affiliated with Ger in Israel. Currently, there are about 100 such institutions. The Beis Yisrael helped rebuild the Ger movement after its virtual destruction in World War II.

Distribution of Gerrer Hasidim 
Almost all Ger Hasidim living in pre-war Europe (approximately 100,000 Hasidim) were murdered by the Nazis in the Holocaust. Avraham Mordechai Alter, who managed to escape, set about the task of rebuilding the movement in the British Mandate of Palestine. It is generally accepted that he was released by the Nazis, and was then able to move to Palestine, because of a very large ransom paid by his followers to the Nazis. Under its post-war leaders, the movement began to flourish again. With approximately 12,000 families, Ger is the third-largest Hasidic dynasty in the world today, comprising 9.2% of the world population of Hasidim. Large communities of Gerrer Hasidim exist in Israel, in Bnei Brak (2294 families / 19% of the Hasidic population), Ashdod (2218 families / 45%), and Jerusalem (1921 families / 12%), and a slightly smaller community of 1,027 families (6% of the Hasidic population) exists in the Borough Park neighborhood of Brooklyn, New York. Smaller communities with hundreds of families have also been established in Israel, such as Arad, Beit Shemesh, Kiryat Gat, Hatzor HaGlilit, Haifa, Dimona, Tel Aviv, and Petah Tikva. Internationally, hundreds of families reside in London, Antwerp, Zürich (where they are the largest Hasidic group), Manchester, Monsey, and Lakewood, with tens more living in Los Angeles, Queens, Montreal, Melbourne, and Chicago. Ger maintains a well-developed educational network of Talmud Torahs, yeshivas, and kollels, as well as Beis Yaakov schools for girls. The dynasty is the wealthiest in Israel, and its leaders dominate the Agudat Israel political party.

Center 

The group's headquarters is located in Jerusalem. During and after the British Mandate, the group's beth midrash was at the Sfas Emes Yeshiva, near Mahane Yehuda. Later on, the synagogue moved to Ralbach Street in the Geula neighborhood, and in the late 1990s, the Great Beth Midrash Gur was inaugurated on Yirmeyahu Street, near the Schneller Orphanage complex. In 2015, an extension to the building was begun, and on Rosh Hashanah 2018 (5779), the second wing of the Beth Medrash was inaugurated.

Beginning with the emigration of Avraham Mordechai Alter to Israel, the rebbes of Ger lived in Jerusalem, with the exception of the current Rebbe Yaakov Aryeh Alter, who moved to Jerusalem only in 2012. The group has "shtibelekh" in most ultra-Orthodox neighborhoods in the city. As other Hasidic courts, Ger also expanded in Jerusalem following the immigration of young couples from Europe and the United States.

Identifying features of Ger 

The men are distinguished by their dark Hasidic garb, and by their pants tucked into their socks, called hoyzn-zokn (not to be confused with the breeches, called halber-hoyzn, worn by men in some other Hasidic groups). They wear a round felt hat, and a high, almost-pointed kapel. They raise their sidelocks from the temples, and tuck them under the yarmulke, nearly hiding them. On Shabbos and Jewish holidays, married men wear the high circular fur hat of the Polish Hasidim, called a spodik by Galicianers (not to be confused with the much flatter shtreimel worn by married men in Hasidic groups which do not hail from Congress Poland). Ger has produced some of the most prolific composers of Jewish liturgical music of all time such as Yankel Talmud (1885-1965), who was known as "the Beethoven of the Gerrer Rebbes".

Kehilas Pnei Menachem
In October 2019, some Gerrer Hasidim under the leadership of Shaul Alter, formed a new kehilla called "Kehilas Pnei Menachem" which is independent of the mainstream Gerrer hassidic court.

On November 8, 2021, the Jerusalem Post reported that Kehilas Pnei Menachem numbers some 500 families in Israel, with another 300 in the USA, while the mainstream Gur community in Israel is thought to number as many as 100,000 people (the equivalent of 11,494 families, according to a November 2021 report by Israel's National Economic Council which averages 6.7 children per Haredi family).

History of Kehilas Pnei Menachem
On October 22, 2019, the Ger Hasidic dynasty split for the first time in its history, following a public Sukkot event held by Shaul Alter, the cousin of the Gerrer Rebbe, Yaakov Aryeh Alter, at which donation and school enrollment forms for the new group were passed out for children of the attendees. Tensions between the two rabbis had appeared repeatedly over the preceding two decades, in particular after Yaakov Aryeh in 2016 closed the prestigious Sfas Emes yeshiva in Jerusalem, at which Shaul Alter was the Rosh Yeshiva, and failed to invite Shaul Alter in 2019 to the wedding of his grandson.

Gerrer dynastic leadership 

 Grand Rabbi Yitzchak Meir Alter (1798–1866), (the Chiddushei HaRim), first Gerrer Rebbe from 1859 to 1866
 Grand Rabbi Chanokh Heynekh HaKohen Levin (1798–1870), second Gerrer Rebbe from 1866 to 1870
 Rabbi Avraham Mordechai Alter (1815–1855)
 Grand Rabbi Yehudah Aryeh Leib Alter (1847–1905), (the Sfas Emes), third Gerrer Rebbe from 1870 to 1905
 Grand Rabbi Avraham Mordechai Alter (1866–1948), (the Imrei Emes), fourth Gerrer Rebbe from 1905 to 1948
 Grand Rabbi Yisrael Alter (1895–1977), (the Beis Yisroel), fifth Gerrer Rebbe from 1948 to 1977
 Grand Rabbi Simchah Bunim Alter (1898–1992), (the Lev Simcha), sixth Gerrer Rebbe from 1977 to 1992
 Grand Rabbi Yaakov Aryeh Alter (born 1939),  eighth Gerrer Rebbe from 1996 to present
 Grand Rabbi Pinchas Menachem Alter (1926–1996), (the Pnei Menachem), seventh Gerrer Rebbe from 1992 to 1996
Rabbi Shaul Alter (born 1957),  leader of Kehilas Pnei Menachem (an offshoot from the Ger Hasidic Dynasty) from 2019 to present

Takanot 
Ger is known as having the strictest views among Orthodox Jews regarding sexual relations. In 1948, Rabbi Yisrael Alter established the "Ordinances on Holiness", known as the takanot (called takunes in the vernacular of Yiddish used by Ger Hasidim), which regulate daily living. The rules were passed on verbally, and were never written down until 2016, when a former member of the Ger Hasidic sect published them on Facebook. The takanot prescribe, for example, that a couple should not have sex more than twice a month, should do so silently and quickly, and the man should always be on top. In addition to rules about sexual relations, they include prohibitions for men on everyday activities such as combing one's hair, using soap on days other than Friday (in preparation for Shabbos), smoking, and reading the newspaper. The ordinances are reputed to have had a detrimental effect on the demand for Gerrer bachelors in the Hasidic match-making market.

In 2009, a Gerrer woman, Sarah Einfeld, appeared in a short documentary film, titled in English Shrew (in Hebrew, Soreret). During the filming, she decided to desert Ger, and to adopt a secular way of life. In her blog, she reported on the "repression" of women in Ger, highlighting the suppression of sexuality under the regime of these rules.

See also 
 List of Hasidic dynasties
Hasidic Judaism in Poland

References

External links 

 Alter family tree
 First Gerrer Rebbe, Biographie, Orthodox Union
 
 Gerszon Góra, The Gerer Shtibl — Memories about a little Ger synagogue in Poland
 Arthur Green, Ger Hasidic Dynasty, The YIVO Encyclopedia of Jews in Eastern Europe
 Tamar Rotem, Gur Hasidim and sexual separation first part Haaretz 3 February 2012 For members of Israel's ultra-Orthodox Gur sect, sex is a sin second part Haaretz 10 February 2012.